The Memorial Peppe Greco is an annual men's 10 kilometres road race which takes place in Scicli, Italy. Also known as the Scicli 10km, the race was created in 1990 by Giovanni Voi. The course consists of ten one-kilometre laps on the streets of the city, which includes a difficult 300-metre stretch uphill over cobblestones.

History
After varying distances in the first four years of the race, the course was standardised to its current format in 1994. A local man, Giorgio Adamo, won the first race but over the following years the high quality of the competition established the Memorial Peppe Greco as an elite-level meeting on the European road running circuit, with past winners including world record breakers Paul Tergat, Haile Gebrselassie and Kenenisa Bekele.

The race was created to honour Peppe Greco, an Italian doctor who died in a car accident. It became an international competition in 1994 and rose to prominence in 1995 after Haile Gebrselassie and Paul Tergat chose to use the race as their first "re-match" after the World Championship 10,000 metres final.

The course record is held by Haile Gebrselassie, who ran 28 minutes and 22 seconds to win the 1997 edition of the race. A women's five kilometres race was also held in 2000 and 2001, and Merima Denboba is the course record holder with 16 minutes and 32 seconds. A new women's race was introduced in 2010 and took place over a course of roughly 7 km, a day before the men's race.

Winners

See also
BOclassic
Giro di Castelbuono

References

External links
Official website 

10K runs
Athletics competitions in Italy
Scicli
Recurring sporting events established in 1990
Sport in Sicily
Annual sporting events in Italy